Shri Narayan Yadav is an Indian politician, member of Bihar Legislative Assembly of India and former Cabinet Urban Development Minister of Bihar in Lalu Yadav and Rabri Devi ministry. He represents the Sahebpur Kamal constituency in Begusarai district of Bihar.  In the October 2010 Bihar Assembly elections,  Yadav won the Ballia seat defeating his nearest rival Jamshed Ashraf of Janata Dal United. Yadav has won this constituency 9 times. Yadav defeated Jamshed Ashraf of LJP in October 2005 and in February 2005, Md. Tanweer Hasan of JD(U) in 2000, Krishna Mohan Yadav an Independent in 1995, Samsu Joha of Congress in 1990, Samsu Joha of Congress in 1985, Chandrabhanu Devi of Congress (I) in 1980 and Ram Lakhan Yadav of Congress in 1977.

References

Rashtriya Janata Dal politicians
Bihar MLAs 2015–2020
People from Begusarai district
Living people
Year of birth missing (living people)